Bermonville is a former commune in the Seine-Maritime department in the Normandy region in northern France. On 1 January 2017, it was merged into the new commune Terres-de-Caux.

Geography
Junction 8 of the A29 autoroute is within the commune's borders.

Heraldry

Population

Places of interest
 The church of Notre-Dame, dating from the twelfth century.
 A sixteenth century manorhouse

See also
Communes of the Seine-Maritime department

References

Former communes of Seine-Maritime